Talthybius was herald and friend to Agamemnon in the Trojan War.

Mythology 
Talthybius was the one who took Briseis from the tent of Achilles. Preceding the duel of Menelaus and Paris, Agamemnon charges him to fetch a sheep for sacrifice. He died at Aegium in Achaia.

Talthybius appears in Euripides’ Hecuba and The Trojan Women. In addition, he has a small role in The Iliad. In Book IV, Agamemnon orders Talthybius to fetch the medic Machaon after Menelaus is wounded with an arrow shot by Pandarus. In Hecuba and The Trojan Women, Talthybius seems to always be the bearer of bad news. In The Trojan Women, he tells Hecuba that all of the women are being divided up and given to different Greek Heroes as slaves. He says that Cassandra will be given to Agamemnon and that Hecuba herself will be given to Odysseus.  Furthermore, Talthybius is the one who tells Andromache of the Greeks’ plan to kill Astyanax, her son by Hector. The plan is to throw Astyanax (who is only a small child) from the towers of Troy because it would not be wise to let the son of a Trojan hero reach adulthood.  In Hecuba, Talthybius brings an order from Agamemnon to Hecuba, telling her to bury her daughter, Polyxena, who was sacrificed to Achilles.

He exercises significant independence in the way he carries out his orders given to him from the commanders. He was worshipped as a hero at Sparta, where sacrifices took place and were offered to him. He served in the Trojan War alongside his followers and others who supported him. Talthybius was committed to the interests of the Greek commanders and takes care to avoid their disapproval. In his dealings with the captive women he is felt in the main to be a sympathetic figure.

See also
Eurybates

Notes

References 

 Euripides, The Complete Greek Drama edited by Whitney J. Oates and Eugene O'Neill, Jr. in two volumes. 1. Hecuba, translated by E. P. Coleridge. New York. Random House. 1938. Online version at the Perseus Digital Library.
 Euripides, Euripidis Fabulae. vol. 1. Gilbert Murray. Oxford. Clarendon Press, Oxford. 1902. Greek text available at the Perseus Digital Library.
 Homer, The Iliad with an English Translation by A.T. Murray, Ph.D. in two volumes. Cambridge, MA., Harvard University Press; London, William Heinemann, Ltd. 1924. . Online version at the Perseus Digital Library.
 Homer, Homeri Opera in five volumes. Oxford, Oxford University Press. 1920. . Greek text available at the Perseus Digital Library.

Achaeans (Homer)